The Columbia City Jazz Dance Company (CCJC) was formed in 1990 by artistic director Dale Lam and was named one of the "Top 50 Dance Companies in the USA" by Dance Spirit magazine for the 2002/2003 season. The Company has an active community outreach program and performs over 20 performances each year in Columbia and smaller cities in South Carolina.

In addition to public performances in South Carolina communities and schools, CCJC completed a five-week tour of China during July 2006, 30 shows in Singapore during the winter of 2000, danced for the European Cultural Month festivities in Plovdiv, Bulgaria, the 1999 Tanzsommer Festival in Innsbruck, Austria, and has performed during the Piccolo Spoleto Festival in Charleston, S.C.

CCJC holds an established "Master Instructor Series" each year by bringing in a number of internationally known guest artists to teach master classes. Past instructors have included Nick Lazzarini, Danny Tidwell, Travis Wall, Ivan Koumaev, Mia Michaels, Mandy Moore, Ray Leeper, Desiree Robbins, Doug Caldwell, Liz Imperio, Jason Parsons, A.C. Ciulla, Dee Caspary, and others.

The Columbia City Jazz Dance Company is supported in part through a Tier III Grant made possible by contributors to the United Arts Fund of the Cultural Council of Richland and Lexington Counties, the City of Columbia, and the South Carolina Arts Commission, which receives funding from the National Endowment of the Arts.

References

External links
 

Dance companies in the United States
Music of South Carolina
Contemporary dance companies
Dance education in the United States
1990 establishments in South Carolina
Musical groups established in 1990
Dance in South Carolina